Fanfreluche (April 9, 1967 – July 29, 1999) was a Canadian-bred Champion Thoroughbred racehorse.

Background
Fanfreluche was a bay mare bred in Canada. She was named by her French-Canadian owner Jean-Louis Levesque for the title character of a popular children's television show on the French-language division of the Canadian Broadcasting Corporation.

Racing career
Successfully raced in Canada as a two-year-old, at age three Fanfreluche's performances in both Canada and the United States earned her the Sovereign Award for Canadian Horse of the Year. Fanfreluche was voted American Champion Three-Year-Old Filly in 1970 by the Thoroughbred Racing Association. Office Queen won the rival Daily Racing Form poll in the last year that champions were voted on separately.

In 1981 Fanfreluche was inducted into the Canadian Horse Racing Hall of Fame.

Breeding record
At the end of her three-year-old racing season, Fanfreluche was sold as a broodmare prospect to prominent American horseman Bertram R. Firestone for a then world-record price of $1.3 million. Bred to notable stallion Buckpasser, in 1972 she produced the two-time Canadian Horse of the Year and Hall of Fame inductee L'Enjoleur. She also produced two other champions, La Voyageuse and Medaille d'Or. She has numerous stakes-winning descendants worldwide, including Encosta de Lago and Holy Roman Emperor.

Kidnapping
On June 25, 1977 while in foal to Secretariat, Fanfreluche was abducted from Claiborne Farm near Paris, Kentucky. In December, five months after her disappearance, the FBI located her 158 miles south near the small town of Tompkinsville, not far from the Tennessee border. Fanfreluche was being kept by a family who said they had found her wandering along the country road.  Returned safely to Claiborne Farm, in the spring of 1978 Fanfreluche gave birth to her foal, a colt given the French language name "Sain Et Sauf", which in English translates as Safe And Sound.

A few years later, on February 8, 1983, the Irish racehorse Shergar was also the victim of a kidnapping but unlike Fanfreluche, Shergar was never found.

Fanfreluche died on July 29, 1999 of old age and was buried at Big Sink Farm in Midway, Kentucky.

Pedigree

External links
 Fanfreluche's pedigree and stats

References

1967 racehorse births
1999 racehorse deaths
Individual thefts
Racehorses bred in Canada
Racehorses trained in Canada
Eclipse Award winners
Canadian Champion racehorses
Canadian Thoroughbred Horse of the Year
Canadian Horse Racing Hall of Fame inductees
Thoroughbred family 4-g